1907 Országos Bajnokság I (men's water polo) was the fourth waterpolo championship in Hungary. There was only one participant, who thus won the champion without any match.

At the end of the year Magyar Úszó Egylet was established and from this time this Union was responsible for organising the championships.

Sources 
Gyarmati Dezső: Aranykor (Hérodotosz Könyvkiadó és Értékesítő Bt., Budapest, 2002.)

1907 in water polo
1907 in Hungarian sport
Seasons in Hungarian water polo competitions